Struthiolaria papulosa, common name the "ostrich foot snail" or "ostrich foot shell", is a species of medium-sized sea snail, a marine gastropod mollusc in the family Struthiolariidae.

References

 Rosenberg, G. 1992. Encyclopedia of Seashells. Dorset: New York. 224 pp. page(s): 66
 Powell A. W. B., New Zealand Mollusca, William Collins Publishers Ltd, Auckland, New Zealand 1979 
Struthiolaria papulosa on Gastropoda Stromboidea - Ulrich Wieneke and Han Stoutjesdijk

Struthiolariidae
Gastropods of New Zealand
Gastropods described in 1784